Egaleo Football Club is a Greek professional football club based in Egaleo, a suburb of Athens, Greece. Founded in 1946, it uses all documents of previous club (Ierapolis F.C., founded in 1931). The team currently competes in the Super League 2, the second tier of Greek football and it holds home matches at Stavros Mavrothalassitis Stadium.

Club colours are blue and white.

History
Egaleo was founded in 1931 by Demetrios Haniotis and Georgios Aronis, as Athletic Union of Ierapolis (Αθλητική Ένωση Ιεραπόλεως – Athlitiki Enosis Ieropoleos). In 1946, three other clubs in the district merged with A.E. Ierapoleos to form Athletic Club Egaleo (Αθλητικός Όμιλος Αιγάλεω – Athlitikos Omilos Egaleo), which managed to reach for the first time the first division in 1961.

In the 2003–04 season, Egaleo managed its second better ever classification, fifth (fourth in the 1970–71 season), playing UEFA Cup for the first time in 2004–05, appearing in the group stages (after defeating Gençlerbirliği of Turkey 2–1 score on aggregate) with FK Partizan, S.S. Lazio, Middlesbrough and Villarreal CF, which ended with the conquest of just one point. In the league, the club finished sixth, trailing PAOK by just one point.

After a disappointing 2006–07, Egaleo was relegated back to the second level. Another relegation followed in the next year, and a third in 2008–09.

In August 2009, a merger between Egaleo and Ilisiakos F.C. took place, as the other club participated in the second division, with the purchase being made effective by Egaleo's owner Thomas Mitropoulos; the new club, which took Ilisiakos' place, was renamed Egaleo A.O.

At the end of the 2009–10 season, due to the merger being declared illegal by the Greek Council of State, Egaleo FC was relegated to the Delta Ethniki.

Honours

Domestic

Leagues
Second Division
Winners (4): 1964–65, 1976–77, 1982–83, 2000–01
Third Division
Winners (2): 1998–99, 2018–19
Fourth Division
Winners (2): 1995–96, 2012–13

Regional

Leagues
Athens FCA Championship
Winners (8): 1947–48, 1949–50, 1953–54, 1959–60, 1960–61, 2014–15, 2015–16, 2016–17

Cups
Athens FCA Cup
Winners (1): 2014−15

Supporters
The ultras group Gate 12 have friendly relation with fans of CD Leganés, the towns of Egaleo and Leganés happen to be twinned too.

Players

Current squad

Notable former players
Internationally capped players or players who have over 50 appearances for the club
 Anestis Agritis
 Giorgos Barkoglou
 Eleftherios Poupakis
 Giannis Skopelitis
 Kostas Papoutsis
 Antonis Petropoulos
 Sotiris Leontiou
 Victor Mitropoulos
 Dimitrios Konstantopoulos
 Agustin Kola
 Marko Marić
 Danijel Cesarec
 Daniel Edusei
 Bennard Yao Kumordzi
 Faraz Fatemi
 Olivier Makor
 Mahamadou Sidibè
 Srđan Kljajević
 Paweł Kieszek
 Aleksandar Stojanović
 Aleko Yordan
 Dragan Stojkov

Notable former managers
 Les Shannon
 Ilie Dumitrescu
 Lefter Küçükandonyadis

Notable Chairmen
 Yiorghos Martinis (first chairman)
 Nikolaos Michos
 Dimitris Chaniotis
 Yannis Tresos
 Yiorghos Karabateas
 Yannis Panteliadis
 Dimitri Tusmanov
 Yiorghos Dalakouras
 Alexandros Stavropoulos
 Christos Kanellopoulos
 Victor Mitropoulos
 Dimitris Kalogeropoulos
 Alexis Kougias
 Ioannis Paltoglou

Technical staff

European matches

References

Sources
"Απ' τις λαμαρίνες στα σαλόνια της Ευρώπης" (Nikos D. Nikolaidis, "Embryo" Publications)

External links
2003–04 EUFO team profile
GOAL4Replay team profile
Egaleo Ultras Group

 
Football clubs in Athens
Association football clubs established in 1931
Football clubs in Attica
1931 establishments in Greece
Super League Greece 2 clubs